La Coma is a locality and the capital of the municipality of La Coma i la Pedra, in Province of Lleida province, Catalonia, Spain. As of 2020, it has a population of 132.

Geography 
La Coma is located 146km northeast of Lleida.

References

Populated places in the Province of Lleida